"Amber" is a song from American rock band 311. Focusing more on their reggae roots, the song is about Nick Hexum's then fiancée and then Eden's Crush member Nicole Scherzinger. Scherzinger appears briefly in the music video, playing in the ocean with Hexum. Although it is not one of the highest-charting singles (hitting number 13 on the Modern Rock chart), it ended up their longest lasting on the Alternative Rock chart. It is also their only single that received a certification by the RIAA, achieving Gold status. It is considered to be the band's signature song, along with "Down" and "All Mixed Up".

The song's intro was remixed on Greatest Hits '93–'03.

Background

Composition
The song is composed in key of C major.

Reception

In popular culture
A live performance video clip of "Amber" was featured on the DVD extras for the 2004 movie, 50 First Dates starring Adam Sandler and Drew Barrymore. The album version of "Amber" was featured in the movie itself.

The song was also on the soundtrack for the movie Dear John.

The song is also featured in the background of a bar scene in the 2008 movie, Forgetting Sarah Marshall.

Charts

Release history

References

External links
 

2001 singles
Reggae fusion songs
Rock ballads
Songs written by Nick Hexum
Music videos directed by The Malloys
2001 songs
Volcano Entertainment singles
311 (band) songs